Live from Radio City Music Hall is Liza Minnelli's fifth solo live album, released in 1992. The entire show was directed for television by Louis J. Horvitz and was released as a PBS special.  and was later released on VHS and DVD.

Track listing

References

External links

Liza Minnelli live albums
1991 live albums
Albums produced by Phil Ramone
Columbia Records live albums
Television shows directed by Louis J. Horvitz
Albums recorded at Radio City Music Hall